Norfund is a development finance institution established by the Norwegian Storting (parliament) in 1997 and owned by the Norwegian Ministry of Foreign Affairs. The fund receives its investment capital from the state budget. Its head office is located in Oslo with local offices in Thailand, Costa Rica, Kenya, South Africa and Ghana.

Norfund's mission is to create jobs and to improve lives by investing in businesses that drive sustainable development in developing countries. The investments are done on commercial terms directly in companies or through local investment funds. Norfund invest in developing countries, and has chosen a strategic focus on Sub-Saharan Africa, and selected countries in Central America and South-East Asia.

Clean energy, financial services and agribusiness are the three main sectors in which Norfund invests. Norfund is mainly an equity investor (normally no higher share that 35%), but the fund can also give loans. Norfund is monitoring the economic, environmental and social consequences of its investments to ensure a sustainable impact.

Norfund is also part of EDFI, the Association of European Development Finance Institutions.

The largest investment made by Norfund was the strategic subsidiary SN Power (originally established in partnership with Statkraft), a company producing hydroelectric power in developing countries. SN Power was sold to Scatec in 2021 for USD 1,17 billion.

At the end of 2020 Norfund had committed investments totaling NOK 28.4 billion in 170 projects. In total, 377,000 persons were employed world-wide in businesses where Norfund had invested, and the companies paid NOK 16,9 billion in local taxes in 2020. The share of investments by Norfund to LDC was 39%. (Norfund's annual report 2020).

The Norwegian efforts to promote private sector development in poor countries was evaluated in 2010. The report refers to Norfund as one of the main policy instruments in development assistance towards business.

An analysis from 2020 showed that Norfund's investments in greenfield renewable energy plants avoid 8 million tons of  emissions annually, equal to 1/6th of Norway's annual emissions.

In July 2021, the Norwegian Government announced that it had decided to allocate NOK 10 billion over a period of five years for a new fund that will invest in renewable energy in developing countries with the aim of reducing greenhouse gas emissions, and that Norfund will be given responsibility for administering the fund.

On May 13, 2020, the fund revealed that it had been the victim of a cyberattack, which it referred to as "an advanced data breach", that took place on March 16, 2020. The attack resulted in US$10 million (approximately NOK 100 million), intended for a microfinance institution in Cambodia, being routed to an account in Mexico. According to the fund's statement, the breach was discovered on April 30 when the fraudsters attempted a second attack. As of September 2020, the crime remained unsolved. Norfund stated that they are working together with Norway's cyber crime agency and bankers DNB to investigate the crime, and professional services company PwC to investigate weaknesses in Norfund's IT security infrastructure.

References

Private equity companies of Norway
Government-owned companies of Norway
1997 establishments in Norway
Financial services companies established in 1997
Companies based in Oslo
Development finance institutions